A Fine and Private Place was a proposed feature film from Paul Watson that was abandoned during filming, ostensibly due to poor weather.

Production
Paul Watson was a documentary filmmaker who had written the script. Bryan Forbes, head of EMI Films, greenlit the film and production began in Cornwall.

The film soon fell behind schedule, forcing Forbes to visit the set. He felt the footage would not cut together and believed the first-time director was incompetent. Forbes shut down the production and fired Watson.

Over the next two weeks Forbes attempted to resuscitate the project with director John Hough but he eventually decided not to proceed and the film was abandoned. Filming ceased in May 1970.

Watson subsequently went on to a highly successful career as a documentary filmmaker.

References

External links
 A Fine and Private Place at BFI

1970s unfinished films
EMI Films films
1970s English-language films